Sir William Morice, 1st Baronet (c. 1628 – 7 February 1690), of Werrington (then in Devon but now in Cornwall), was an English Member of Parliament.

Origins
Morice was the eldest son of Sir William Morice, a Member of Parliament who assisted in the Restoration of King Charles II, and was knighted and appointed Secretary of State for the Northern Department in 1660.

Career
The younger William was created a baronet on 20 April 1661. In 1689, he entered the House of Commons as Member of Parliament (MP) for Newport, in Cornwall, but died a year later.

Marriages and children
 
He married twice:
Firstly to Gertrude Bampfylde, daughter of Sir John Bampfylde, 1st Baronet of Poltimore and North Molton in Devon, by whom he had three children:
William Morice (1660–1688) who married Anne Lower, and predeceased his father without issue.
Mary Morice, who married (as his 3rd wife) Sir John Carew, 3rd Baronet (1635–1692) of Antony, Cornwall.
Gertrude Morice (d. 1679), who married Sir Walter Yonge, 3rd Baronet
Secondly he married in 1676 Elizabeth Reynell, 4th daughter of Thomas Reynell (d. 1698) of East Ogwell, Devon, MP for Devon in 1656 and MP for Ashburton 1658 and Sheriff of Devon 1677. By her he was the father of:
Sir Nicholas Morice, 2nd Baronet (1690–1715).

Sources
Morice genealogy
Concise Dictionary of National Biography (1930)

References

1620s births
1690 deaths
Members of the Parliament of England for Newport (Cornwall)
Morice, William, 1st Baronet
English MPs 1689–1690